Derbyshire County Cricket Club in 1902 was the cricket season when the English club  Derbyshire had been playing for thirty-one years. It was their eighth season in the County Championship and  they won five matches to finish tenth in the Championship table.

1902 season

Derbyshire  played sixteen games in the County Championship in 1902, two matches against London County, one match against MCC and one against the touring Australians.

Derbyshire won four matches in the County Championship which brought them up to tenth in the table. The captain for the year was Albert Lawton in his first season as captain. Maynard Ashcroft  was top scorer. Billy Bestwick took most wickets.

The most significant additions to the Derbyshire squad in the season was Thomas Forrester  who carried on playing for the club for many seasons. Also making his debut was Charles Ollivierre the first Caribbean to play for an English county who also played several seasons. Noah Buxton played occasionally until 1911 and Guy Wilson played once in 1902 and once in 1905. Other players who  made their debut but played only in 1902 were Charles Lyon who played two matches and Ernest Stapleton, Archibold Cooper and Bert Hall who played one each.

Matches

{| class="wikitable" width="100%"
! bgcolor="#efefef" colspan=6 | List of  matches
|- bgcolor="#efefef"
!No.
!Date
!V
!Result 
!Margin
!Notes
|- 
|1
 |  19 May 1902
| Hampshire  County Ground, Southampton 
|bgcolor="#00FF00"|Won
| 180 runs
| Llewellyn 7-59; JJ Hulme 5-57 and 7-48; Soar 5-80 
|- 
|2
|29 May 1902
| Yorkshire   Dewsbury and Savile Ground  
|bgcolor="#FFCC00"|Drawn
|
| TL Taylor 106  
|- 
|3
|05 Jun 1902
| YorkshireQueen's Park, Chesterfield
|bgcolor="#FFCC00"|Drawn
|
| TL Taylor 142; JJ Hulme 5-68; Hirst 5-32; Haigh 5-31 
|- 
|4
| 09 Jun 1902
| Warwickshire  Edgbaston, Birmingham 
|bgcolor="#FF0000"|Lost
| 9 wickets
| Hargreave 6-54; Santall 5-50 
|- 
|5
|12 Jun 1902
| Worcestershire North Road Ground, Glossop 
|bgcolor="#FFCC00"|Drawn
|
|W Bestwick  7-28; Wilson 6-53 
|- 
|6
|19 Jun 1902
| Australians  County Ground, Derby 
|bgcolor="#FF0000"|Lost
| 8 wickets
| W Bestwick  6-82; Saunders 6-40 
|- 
|7
| 23 Jun 1902
| MCC     Lord's Cricket Ground, St John's Wood 
|bgcolor="#FF0000"|Lost
| 6 wickets
| Trott 7-84; Mead 6-36 
|- 
|8
|26 Jun 1902
|London County Cricket Club   County Ground, Derby  
|bgcolor="#FF0000"|Lost
| 6 wickets
|AE Lawton 149; CJB Wood 124; Grace 5-105; Llewellyn 5-92 and 6-101 
|- 
|9
| 30 Jun 1902
| Leicestershire Queen's Park, Chesterfield 
|bgcolor="#FFCC00"|Drawn
|
| LG Wright  101; EM Ashcroft 104; AE Knight 103 
|- 
|10
|03 Jul 1902
|  Surrey Kennington Oval 
|bgcolor="#FF0000"|Lost
| 7 wickets
| VFS Crawford 101; W Bestwick  6-107; Richardson 5-81 
|- 
|11
|10 Jul 1902
| Leicestershire  Aylestone Road, Leicester
|bgcolor="#00FF00"|Won
| 242 runs
| EM Ashcroft 162; Coe 6-40; A Warren 7-70 
|- 
|12
| 14 Jul 1902
| Nottinghamshire   County Ground, Derby  
|bgcolor="#FF0000"|Lost
| 9 wickets
| Iremonger 146; Gunn 120; Hallam 5-46; Wass 6-152 
|- 
|13
|21 Jul 1902
|London County Cricket Club   Crystal Palace Park 
|bgcolor="#00FF00"|Won
| 99 runs
| Gill 6-83; W Bestwick  8-52; Braund 5-70 
|- 
|14
|24 Jul 1902
| Essex   County Ground, Derby 
|bgcolor="#FF0000"|Lost
| 120 runs
| McGahey 5-24; JJ Hulme 5-18; Mead 6-55
|- 
|15
|04 Aug 1902
| Hampshire   County Ground, Derby 
|bgcolor="#FFCC00"|Drawn
|
| AE Lawton 146; Llewellyn 109 and 5-117 
|- 
|16
|07 Aug 1902
| Worcestershire   County Ground, New Road, Worcester 
|bgcolor="#FFCC00"|Drawn
|
| HK Foster 112; FL Bowley 122; RE Foster 109  
|- 
|17
|11 Aug 1902
| Nottinghamshire    Trent Bridge, Nottingham 
|bgcolor="#FF0000"|Lost
| Innings and 89 runs
| Gunn 101; Shrewbury 108; W Bestwick 6-82; Wass 5-84 and 6-53 
|- 
|18
|14 Aug 1902
| Warwickshire   County Ground, Derby 
|bgcolor="#00FF00"|Won
| Innings and 250 runs
| CA Ollivierre 167; AE Lawton  126; A Warren 6-33 
|- 
|19
|18 Aug 1902
|  Surrey  North Road Ground, Glossop 
|bgcolor="#FFCC00"|Drawn
|
|  
|- 
|20
|21 Aug 1902
| Essex   County Ground, Leyton 
|bgcolor="#00FF00"|Won
| 15 runs
| Lucas 103; Mead 5-44 and 5-59; A Warren 6-75; W Bestwick  7-55 
|-

Statistics

County Championship batting averages

(a) Figures adjusted for non CC matches

Outside the County Championship, E Stapleton played against MCC and GD Wilson  against London County

County Championship bowling averages

Wicket Keeping

 Joe Humphries  Catches 41,  Stumping  3

See also
Derbyshire County Cricket Club seasons
1902 English cricket season

References

1902 in English cricket
Derbyshire County Cricket Club seasons
English cricket seasons in the 20th century